Sébastien Lareau and Alex O'Brien defeated Mahesh Bhupathi and Leander Paes in the final, 6–3, 6–2, 6–2 to win the doubles tennis title at the 1999 ATP Tour World Championships.

Jacco Eltingh and Paul Haarhuis were the reigning champions, but did not compete together in 1999. Eltingh retired from the sport on November 22, 1998; Haarhuis qualified with Jared Palmer, but was eliminated in the round-robin stage.

Seeds

Draw

Finals

Gold group
Standings are determined by: 1. number of wins; 2. number of matches; 3. in two-players-ties, head-to-head records; 4. in three-players-ties, percentage of sets won, or of games won; 5. steering-committee decision.

Green group
Standings are determined by: 1. number of wins; 2. number of matches; 3. in two-players-ties, head-to-head records; 4. in three-players-ties, percentage of sets won, or of games won; 5. steering-committee decision.

External links
Finals Draw
Round robin Draw (Gold Group)
Round robin Draw (Green Group)

Doubles
1999 in American tennis
Tennis tournaments in the United States
Sports in Hartford, Connecticut
Sports competitions in Hartford, Connecticut